The coat of arms of Samoa takes its inspiration from the United Nations, as New Zealand administered Western Samoa first as a League of Nations Mandate and then as a United Nations trusteeship until the country received its independence on 1 January 1962, as Western Samoa. Samoa was the first Polynesian nation to reestablish independence in the 20th century. The background is cross-hatched with a grid like the United Nations arms, most of the other elements are duplicated on the national flag.

Description
The official crest or badge of Samoa is the Public Seal of Samoa excluding the surrounding concentric circles, and the words "The Public Seal of the Independent State of Samoa".  The public seal is defined by legislation as follows:

Historical coat of arms

Notes

Samoa
National symbols of Samoa
Samoa
Samoa
Samoa
Samoa